Warren Woods Public Schools is a school district that provides educational institutions for northeastern Warren, Michigan in Macomb County, Metro Detroit. It has a total student enrollment of 3,198 students with a 19 to 1 student to teacher ratio. Minority enrollment is proportional to Michigan's average demographics. The district boundaries enclose approximately 6 square miles of land.

The school district was formed in the mid-20th century, and some of the building structures were in need of an overhaul. In 2005 the school district began a three-year program intended to update and renovate its school buildings. In 2017 The district proposed a $20 Million bond issue. The money was to be allocated to infrastructure and technology improvements.  It would also be used to replace some buses. The bond issue was approved later that year.

Schools
High schools
 Warren Woods Tower High School. This school has a current enrollment of 1077 students, with an 18:1 student-to-teacher ratio. This school serves grades 9–12. As of 2019, Mike Mackenzie is the principal. Its athletic teams are known as the Titans, and the school colors are Honolulu Blue and Silver.
 Warren Woods Enterprise High School — 120 students; this is an alternative high school.

Middle school
 Warren Woods Middle School. There are 773 students.
Warren Woods Middle School is in the building that once housed Warren Woods High School. Their Mascot is the Wolverine, and the colors are Blue and Gold.

Elementary schools
 Briarwood — 327 students.
 Pinewood — 333 students.
 Westwood Elementary — 556 students covering kindergarten through fifth grade.

Hawthorne Complex
 Warren Woods Administration
Superintendent - Stacey Denewith-Fici
 Warren Woods Adult Ed
 Warren Woods Preschool
 Warren Woods Daycare and S.A.C.C.
 Warren Woods Early Childcare Center

References

External links

 Warren Woods Public Schools

School districts in Michigan
Education in Macomb County, Michigan
Warren, Michigan